The Federal Negarit Gazeta is the government gazette of Ethiopia, defined in Article 71.2 of the 1995 Constitution of Ethiopia and established on 22 August 1995 by the Federal Negarit Gazeta Establishment Proclamation No. 3/1995.

References

External links


government gazettes